The New York City blackout of 1977 was an electricity blackout that affected most of New York City on July 13–14, 1977. The only unaffected neighborhoods in the city were in southern Queens (including neighborhoods of the Rockaways), which were part of the Long Island Lighting Company system, as well as the Pratt Institute campus in Brooklyn, and a few other large apartment and commercial complexes that operated their own historic power generators.

Unlike other blackouts that affected the region, namely the Northeast blackouts of 1965 and 2003, the 1977 blackout was confined to New York City and its immediate surrounding areas. The 1977 blackout also resulted in citywide looting and other criminal activity, including arson, unlike the 1965 and 2003 blackouts.

Prelude

Lightning damage
The events leading up to the blackout began on July 13 at 8:34 p.m. EDT on Wednesday, with a lightning strike at Buchanan South, a substation on the Hudson River, tripping two circuit breakers in Buchanan, New York. The Buchanan South substation converted the 345,000 volts of electricity originating from the 900 MW Indian Point nuclear generating station to lower voltage for commercial use. A loose locking nut combined with a slow-acting upgrade cycle prevented the breaker from reclosing and allowing power to flow again.

A second lightning strike caused the loss of two 345 kV transmission lines, subsequent reclose of only one of the lines, and the loss of power from the nuclear plant at Indian Point. As a result of the strikes, two other major transmission lines became overloaded. Per procedure, Consolidated Edison, the power provider for New York City and some of Westchester County, tried to bring a fast-start generating station online at 8:45 p.m. EDT; however, no one was manning the station, and the remote start failed.

At 8:55 p.m., there was another lightning strike at the Sprain Brook substation in Yonkers, which took out two additional critical transmission lines. As before, only one of the lines was automatically returned to service. This outage of lines from the substation caused the remaining lines to exceed the long-term operating limits of their capacity. After this last failure, Con Edison had to manually reduce the loading on another local generator at their East River facility, due to problems at the plant. This made an already dire situation even worse.

Power reductions
At 9:14 p.m., over 69 minutes from the initial event, New York Power Pool Operators in Guilderland called for Con Edison operators to "shed load." In response, Con Ed operators initiated first a 5% system-wide voltage reduction and then an 8% reduction. These steps had to be completed sequentially and took many minutes. These steps were done in accordance with Con Edison's use of the words "shed load" while the Power Pool operators had in mind opening feeders to immediately drop about 1500 MW of load, not reduce voltage to reduce load a few hundred megawatts.

At 9:19 p.m., the final major interconnection to Upstate New York at Leeds substation tripped due to thermal overload which caused the 345 kV conductors to sag excessively into an unidentified object. This trip caused the 138 kV links with Long Island to overload, and a major interconnection with the New Jersey Public Service Electric and Gas Company (PSEG) began to load even higher than previously reported.

At 9:22 p.m., Long Island Lighting Company opened its 345 kV interconnection to Con Edison to reduce power that was flowing through its system and overloading 138 kV submarine cables between Long Island and Connecticut. While Long Island operators were securing permission from the Power Pool operators to open their 345 kV tie to New York City, phase shifters between New York City and New Jersey were being adjusted to correct heavy flows, and this reduced the loading on the 115 kV cables. The Long Island operators did not notice the drop in 115 kV cable loadings and went ahead with opening their 345 kV tie to New York City.

At 9:24 p.m., the ConEdison operator tried and failed to manually shed load by dropping customers. Five minutes later, at 9:29 p.m., the Goethals-Linden 230 kV interconnection with New Jersey tripped, and the Con Edison system automatically began to isolate itself from the outside world through the action of protective devices that remove overloaded lines, transformers, and cables from service.

Blackout

Power failure
Con Ed could not generate enough power within the city, and the three power lines that supplemented the city's power were overtaxed. Just after 9:27 p.m., the biggest generator in New York City, the 990 MW Ravenswood Generating Unit No. 3 (also known as "Big Allis"), shut down and with it went all of New York City.

By 9:37 p.m., the entire ConEdison power system shut down, almost exactly an hour after the first lightning strike. By 10:26 p.m., operators started a restoration procedure. Power was not fully restored until late the following day. Among the outcomes of the blackout were detailed restoration procedures that are well documented and used in operator training to reduce restoration time.

Crime
The blackout occurred when the city was facing a severe financial crisis and its residents were terrified by the Son of Sam murders. The nation as a whole, especially New York City, was suffering from a protracted economic downturn, and commentators have contrasted the event with the good-natured "Where Were You When the Lights Went Out?" atmosphere of 1965. Some pointed to the financial crisis as a root cause of the disorder; others noted the hot July weather, as the East Coast was in the middle of a brutal heat wave. Still others pointed out that the 1977 blackout came after businesses had closed and their owners had gone home, while in 1965 the blackout occurred during the day and many merchants were still at their properties. However, the 1977 looters continued their illegal activities into the daylight hours of the next day, with police on speed dial.

Looting and vandalism were widespread in New York City, hitting 31 different neighborhoods. Possibly the hardest hit were Crown Heights, where 75 stores on a five-block stretch were looted and damaged, and Bushwick, where arson was rampant, with some 25 fires still burning the next morning. At one point, two blocks of Broadway in Brooklyn, which separates Bushwick from Bedford-Stuyvesant, were on fire. Thirty-five blocks of Broadway were destroyed: 134 stores looted, 45 of them also set ablaze. Thieves stole 50 new Pontiacs from a Bronx car dealership. In Brooklyn, youths were seen backing up cars to stores, tying ropes around the stores' grates, and using their cars to pull the grates away, then looting the stores. There were 550 police officers injured in the mayhem, and 4,500 looters were arrested.

Mayor Abe Beame spoke during the blackout about what citizens were up against during the blackout and what the costs would be.

We've seen our citizens subjected to violence, vandalism, theft, and discomfort. The Blackout has threatened our safety and has seriously impacted our economy. We've been needlessly subjected to a night of terror in many communities that have been wantonly looted and burned. The costs when finally tallied will be enormous.

During New York's 2003 blackout, The New York Times ran a description of the blackout of 1977:

Because of the power failure, LaGuardia and Kennedy airports were closed down for about eight hours, automobile tunnels were closed because of lack of ventilation, and 4,000 people had to be evacuated from the subway system. ConEd called the shutdown an "act of God," enraging Mayor Beame, who charged that the utility was guilty of "gross negligence."

In all, 1,616 stores were damaged in looting and rioting. A total of 1,037 fires were responded to, including 14 multiple-alarm fires. In the largest mass arrest in city history, 3,776 people were arrested. Many had to be stuffed into overcrowded cells, precinct basements and other makeshift holding pens. A congressional study estimated that the cost of damages amounted to a little over $300 million (equivalent to $1.47 billion in 2022).

In addition to the massive looting and violence that had accompanied it, there was also one homicide. Dominick Ciscone, a Brooklyn teenager and aspiring mobster, was shot in the neighborhood of Carroll Gardens while in the company of some friends. He died at the scene. Police investigated several people with whom he had ongoing disputes, but never identified any suspects. In 1997, they received tips from individuals who did not identify themselves, but whom they believed genuinely might know who committed the crime; they did not respond to requests to identify themselves. As of 2021 the killing remains unsolved.

Shea Stadium
Shea Stadium went dark at approximately 9:30 p.m., in the bottom of the sixth inning, with Lenny Randle at bat. The New York Mets were losing 2–1 against the Chicago Cubs. Jane Jarvis, Shea's organist and "Queen of Melody", played "Jingle Bells" and "White Christmas." The game was completed two months later on September 16, with the Cubs winning 5–2. The Yankees were on the road at Milwaukee; less than a week later, Yankee Stadium hosted the All-Star Game on Tuesday, July 19.

Return of power
It was not until the next morning that power began being restored to those areas affected. Around 7 a.m. on July 14, a section of Queens became the first area to get power back, followed shortly afterward by Lenox Hill, Manhattan; the neighboring Yorkville area on the Upper East Side of Manhattan, though, was one of the last areas to get power back that Thursday evening. By 1:45 p.m., service was restored to half of Con Edison's customers, mostly in Staten Island and Queens. It was not until 10:39 p.m. on July 14 that the entire city's power was back online.

For much of July 14, most of the television stations in New York City were off the air (as the areas where those TV stations were located were still without power for much of the day), although WCBS-TV (Channel 2) and WNBC-TV (Channel 4) did manage to stay on the air thanks to gas and diesel-fueled generators, resuming their broadcasts only 25 and 88 minutes after the blackout began, respectively. Although much of New York City was still without power, Belmont Park (a racetrack on the border of Queens and Nassau County in Elmont) did stage their scheduled racing program that afternoon in front of a relatively sparse crowd, as many thought racing would be cancelled that day due to the blackout.

Legacy

Music
There is a popular story that during the blackout numerous looters stole DJ equipment from electronics stores, and this helped spark the hip hop genre -- but the only evidence is some speculation by two early DJs, DJ Disco Wiz and Curtis Fisher, who made the suggestion in an interview for Jim Fricke and filmmaker Charlie Ahearn, who printed it in their book Yes Yes Y'all. Caz later expanded from speculation to mythology, saying in a Slate article and podcast that, when the power went out, he and Wiz were playing records, running their equipment from an outlet in a park. At first they thought the outage was local and caused by something they had done, but realized when they heard stores closing that it was citywide and took advantage of the community's vulnerability to steal a mixing board from a local business. "I went right to the place where I bought my first set of DJ equipment, and I went and got me a mixer out of there." However, most early DJs dismiss this story as inaccurate, with Afrika Bambaataa stating that “Blackout '77 got nothin' to do with hip-hop . . . Whoever came with that is talking a lot of BS.”

David Bowie has stated the blackout was a possible influence on his 1977 song Blackout, "I can't in all honesty say that it was the NY one, though it is entirely likely that that image locked itself in my head."

In late 1977, The Trammps released the song "The Night the Lights Went Out" to commemorate the electrical blackout.

The blackout is the subject of the 2022 song 'Blackout77' by Crippled Black Phoenix.

Complications
The blackout also caused complications for the producers of the film Superman, who were shooting in the area.

The city was eventually given over $11 million by the Carter administration to pay for the damages of the blackout.

Beame accused Con Edison of "gross negligence" but would eventually feel the effect himself. In the mayoral election that year, Beame finished third in the Democratic primary to Ed Koch and Mario Cuomo. Koch would go on to win the general election.

The operating entities in New York fully investigated the blackout, its related causes, and the operator actions. They implemented significant changes, which are still in effect today, to guard against a similar occurrence. Despite these safeguards, there was a blackout in August 2003, although this was caused by a power system failure as far away as Eastlake, Ohio.

On July 13, 2019, on the 42nd anniversary of the event, a Con Edison blackout occurred, affecting 73,000 people on Manhattan's West Side.

See also
Brittle Power
List of incidents of civil unrest in the United States
List of major power outages

References

Further reading
 Goodman, James (2003), Blackout. New York: Farrar, Straus, and Giroux

External links

1977 section contains airchecks from the blackout, Musicradio 77 WABC.
Archive of accounts and reports relating to the blackout , Blackout History Project, George Mason University Center for History and New Media

1977 disasters in the United States
Blackout
Crimes in New York City
Power outages in the United States
History of the Northeastern United States
July 1977 events in the United States
Blackout of 1977
Urban decay in the United States